Azrieli Group is an Israeli real estate and holding company named after its founder David Azrieli. The company is engaged mainly in the development and management of shopping malls and office buildings in Israel.

History 
Azrieli Group started its activities in 1982, developing the Ayalon Mall in Ramat Gan, which opened in July 1985.

The group opened its second mall, Hanegev Mall in Beer Sheva, in 1989 and a third mall, the Jerusalem Mall in 1993.

Between 1996 and 2007 the group developed the Azrieli Center in Tel Aviv, a complex that includes three office buildings above a shopping mall.

In 2014 it sold paint manufacturer Tambour to the Kusto Group, a corporation registered in Singapore and owned by Kazakhs.

Its investment in assisted living facilities for the aged made up 7% of its assets as of 2020.

In July 2019, Azrieli acquired 20% of US-based Compass, to compete in the data center real estate business. In 2021, Azrieli acquired Green Mountain, AS for ₪2.8 Billion.

In January 2022, permission was given by the Tel Aviv local planning and building committee to build the Spiral Tower at the Azrieli Center, which will be a 91-story building or 350-meter (1,150-foot)-high and would become the second-tallest structure in the country.

See also 
 Economy of Israel

References

External links 	

 

Companies established in 1982
Companies listed on the Tel Aviv Stock Exchange
Real estate companies of Israel
1982 establishments in Israel
Companies based in Tel Aviv